Choerophryne variegata is a species of frog in the family Microhylidae. It is endemic to West Papua, Indonesia, and is only known with certainty from its type locality, Digul River. It is assumed that most records from elsewhere refer to other, possibly undescribed species. As the species is only known from one specimen from its vaguely stated type locality, its ecology is essentially unknown, although it is presumed to be a rainforest inhabitant. No other specimen has been collected anywhere near the type locality. Despite all this, vernacular name common rainforest frog has been coined for it.

Names
It is known as lk [lɨk] in the Kalam language of Papua New Guinea, a name that is also sometimes applied to immature Cophixalus parkeri, which has overlapping morphology and habitats with Choerophryne variegata.

Cophixalus shellyi, Choerophryne darlingtoni, and Oxydactyla brevicrus also tend to be identified by Kalam speakers as lk if calling from low vegetation, but as gwnm (usually applied to Cophixalus riparius and Xenorhina rostrata) if found in daytime hiding spots.

Description
The snout is rounded truncate in dorsal view but projecting in profile. The arms are relatively short while the legs are relatively long. There is some basal webbing between the toes 4 and 5. The finger and toes disks are large and truncate.

References

variegata
Endemic fauna of Indonesia
Endemic fauna of New Guinea
Amphibians of Western New Guinea
Taxa named by Pieter Nicolaas van Kampen
Amphibians described in 1923
Taxonomy articles created by Polbot